Attapong Kittichamratsak (born February 13, 1990, as Attapong Nooprom), is a Thai professional footballer who plays as an attacking midfielder for Thai League 3 club Pattaya Dolphins United.

International career

Attapong played for Thailand U19, and played in the 2008 AFC U-19 Championship. In September, 2012 Rattana was called up in a friendly match against Laos

International

International goals

Under-19

Honours

Club
Sriracha 
 Thai Division 1 League: 2010

Ratchaburi
 Thai Division 1 League: 2012

References

External links
 Profile at Goal
 

1990 births
Living people
Attapong Kittichamratsak
Attapong Kittichamratsak
Association football midfielders
Tampines Rovers FC players
Attapong Kittichamratsak
Attapong Kittichamratsak
Attapong Kittichamratsak
Attapong Kittichamratsak
Attapong Kittichamratsak
Singapore Premier League players
Attapong Kittichamratsak
Attapong Kittichamratsak
Thai expatriate footballers
Thai expatriate sportspeople in Singapore
Expatriate footballers in Singapore
Attapong Kittichamratsak